is a Japanese voice actor. He was formerly affiliated with Office Kaoru, but is now represented by Mausu Promotion.

Filmography

Television animation
2006
Atashin'chi as Costumer D
Angel Heart as children
Kanon as Audience
Doraemon
2009
Saki as Referee
2010
Sazae-san
Naruto Shippuden as Gentleman Cat, Townspeople, Foreign traveler
Hakuōki as Aizu Samurai
Asobi ni Iku yo! as Reporter
2011
A Dark Rabbit Has Seven Lives as Student
Naruto Shippuden as Kagami Uchiha, Sagiri (ep 235), Chunin, Researcher, Friend, Kage
Beelzebub as Kōsei Kuroki (Kagegumi), Referee (ep 35)
Blood-C as Schoolboy
Gintama' as Otaku A
Deadman Wonderland as Matayoshi
Gosick as Italian boy, Child soldier
2012
World War Blue as Myomuto
Naruto Shippuden as Konoha Shinobi, Kumogakure Shinobi, Shinobi, Samurai, Zaji
Accel World as Avatar C
Another as Junta Nakao
Inu x Boku SS as Boy 2 (ep 6)
Phi Brain: Puzzle of God Season 2 as Man
Beelzebub as Hasui (ep 54), Quetzalcoatl
2013
Star Blazers: Space Battleship Yamato 2199 as Mitsuru Yoshida
Inazuma Eleven GO: Galaxy as Kazerma Woorg 
Naruto Shippuden as Shū (eps 309-310), Edo tensei Shinobi, Shinobi Union, Naka Uchiha
Sunday Without God as Hardy (eps 7-8), Questine (eps 10-12), Student
Golden Time as Male student
Nagi-Asu: A Lull in the Sea as Gaku Egawa
Samurai Flamenco as Man B, Male student C (ep 4)
Stella Women's Academy, High School Division Class C3 as Enemy C (ep 3)
Strike the Blood as Caster (ep 3), Driver (ep 2), Iron Guard (ep 7)
Ace of Diamond: Second Season as Wataru Kariba, Yoshimi Hidokoro, Narushima Junior High School team
Little Busters! Refrain as Student D (ep 8)
2014
Golden Time as Kazuya
Nobunaga the Fool as Domrémy Village Child A (ep 15)
World Conquest Zvezda Plot as "big bro" smoker (ep 3), capital guard B (ep 11)
No Game No Life as Populace
Samurai Flamenco as Operator
Haikyu!! as Shigeru Yahaba, Kitagawa Daiichi member A (ep 1), Other school's player (ep 16), Other school's student (eps 20, 23), Other school's volleyball club (ep 22)
Aldnoah.Zero as Kisaki Matsuribi
Monthly Girls' Nozaki-kun as Male student (ep 1)
Bladedance of Elementalers as Audience (ep 4)
Naruto Shippuden as Shinobi of Kirigakure, Konohagakure villager, Konoha Anbu, Kakashi's student, Tobirama Senju (young)
In Search of the Lost Future as Yoshida
Noragami as Student D
Psycho-Pass 2 as Kyohei Otsu
2015
Aldnoah Zero Part 2 as Kisaki Matsuribi
Naruto Shippuden as Academy student (eps 418-419), Friend (ep 415), Mikoshi
JoJo's Bizarre Adventure: Stardust Crusaders as Manga Artist (ep 26); Tatsuhiko Doll (ep 40)
Ace of Diamond: Second Season as Seki Naomichi, Wataru Kariba
Hello!! Kin-iro Mosaic as Schoolboy, Teacher B
Seraph of the End as Vampire
Yamada-kun and the Seven Witches as Urara Fan B (ep 1)
Sound! Euphonium as concert band member (ep 5)
My Love Story!! as Three sets male student A
The Heroic Legend of Arslan as Asim (eps 1-2)
Food Wars!: Shokugeki no Soma as Shōji Satō, Male student B (ep 17), Male student E (ep 3), Schoolboy B (eps 1, 14)
Shimoneta: A Boring World Where the Concept of Dirty Jokes Doesn't Exist as Youth B, Zendo-ka Division member B, Disciplinarian B, Man A, Gathered Fabric man, Operator
Knights of Sidonia: Battle for Planet Nine as Mechanic (ep 10)
To Love Ru Darkness 2nd as Pirate C
Charlotte as Shichino
Rokka: Braves of the Six Flowers as Soldier A (ep 3)
Gate: Jieitai Kano Chi nite, Kaku Tatakaeri as Adolescent, Nicola, Personnel, Clerk, Saver, Roger
The Asterisk War as Male student B (ep 1)
Chivalry of a Failed Knight as Student (ep 1), Security guard (ep 3)
Mobile Suit Gundam: Iron-Blooded Orphans as Mikazuki Augus
2016
Prince of Stride: Alternative as Aoi Shima, Arata Samejima
Naruto Shippuden as young Shisui Uchiha
Active Raid 2nd as Sosuke Torigoe, Taiga Nawa
March Comes In like a Lion as Rei Kiriyama
The Disastrous Life of Saiki K. as Kenji Tanihara
Bungo Stray Dogs as John Steinbeck
All Out!! as Shōta Adachigahara
JoJo's Bizarre Adventure: Diamond Is Unbreakable as Terunosuke Miyamoto
Luck & Logic as Ferio
2017
Akiba's Trip: The Animation as Shōhei
Atom: The Beginning as Kensaku Han
Chronos Ruler as Bill Raidan
Dive!! as Jirō Hirayama
The Idolm@ster SideM as Ken Yamamura
Kabukibu! as Jin Ebihara
March Comes In like a Lion 2nd Season as Rei Kiriyama
Naruto Shippuden as Yurito
Saga of Tanya the Evil as Johann
Sagrada Reset as Chiruchiru
2018
Hinamatsuri as Sabu
Doreiku as Gekkō Itabashi
Run with the Wind as Kosuke Sakaki
Jingai-san no Yome as Sora Hikurakawa
Kitsune no Koe as Hu Li
2019
That Time I Got Reincarnated as a Slime as Gelmud
Ultramarine Magmell as Inyō
Over Drive Girl 1/6 as Seijirō Kanmuri
Dr. Stone as Gen
Fire Force as Tōru Kishiri
Fruits Basket as Ritsu Soma
Demon Slayer: Kimetsu no Yaiba as Muichirō Tokitō
Cautious Hero: The Hero Is Overpowered but Overly Cautious as Mash
African Office Worker as Honeyguide
Stars Align as Kazumi Miwa
2020
number24 as Natsusa Yuzuki
Interspecies Reviewers as Narugami
A Certain Scientific Railgun T as Gunha Sogīta
Re:Zero − Starting Life in Another World as Lye Batenkaitos
King's Raid: Successors of the Will as Roi
The Gymnastics Samurai as Hiro Okamachi
Wandering Witch: The Journey of Elaina as Chara
Boruto: Naruto Next Generations as Yurito
2021
Log Horizon: Destruction of the Round Table as Tōri
Dr. Stone: Stone Wars as Gen
Mushoku Tensei: Jobless Reincarnation as Arumanfi
Tokyo Revengers as Nahoya Kawata
Scarlet Nexus as Shiden Ritter
The Case Study of Vanitas as Roland Fortis
Blue Period as Haruka Hashida
2022
The Genius Prince's Guide to Raising a Nation Out of Debt as Manfred
Skeleton Knight in Another World as Sekt
Yu-Gi-Oh! Go Rush!! as Tell Kawai
Chainsaw Man as Kurose
2023
Kubo Won't Let Me Be Invisible as Junta Shiraishi
Demon Slayer: Kimetsu no Yaiba – Swordsmith Village Arc as Muichirō Tokitō
My Clueless First Friend as Daichi Hino
TBA
Migi to Dali as Eiji Ichijō

ONA
Monster Strike (2015) as Akira Kagetsuki

OVA
Ace of Diamond (2014) as Baba

Theatrical animation
Naruto the Movie: Blood Prison (2012) as Muku (young)
Puella Magi Madoka Magica the Movie: Rebellion (2013) as Male student
Boruto: Naruto the Movie (2015) as Yurui
The Anthem of the Heart (2015) as Kazuharu Yamaji
Batman Ninja (2018) as Red Robin
Blue Thermal (2022) as Kaede Hatori

Drama CD
Like a Butterfly (2014) as Male student
Neko to Watashi no Kin'yōbi (2015) as Kanade Maidō

Video games
LORD OF SORCERY (2012) as Fin
Haikyu!! Tsunage! Itadaki no keshiki!! (2014) as Shigeru Yahaba
The Evil Within (2014) as Leslie Withers
Prince of Stride (2015) as Aoi Shima, Arata Samejima
Fire Emblem Fates (2015) as Prince Siegbert
Mobile Suit Gundam: Extreme VS Force (2015) as Mikazuki Augus
Akai Suna Ochiru Tsuki (2016) as Shiro Ebisu
Mobile Suit Gundam: Extreme VS Maxi Boost ON (2016) as Mikazuki Augus
Onmyōji (2016) as Shishio
Akane-sasu Sekai de Kimi to Utau (2017) as Fujiwara no Michinaga
Touken Ranbu (2018) as Nansen Ichimonji
Onmyōji Arena (2018) as Shishio
Fate/Grand Order (2019) as Scandinavia Peperoncino
Fire Emblem: Three Houses (2019) as Cyrill
Another Eden (2019) as Dunarith
Hero's Park (2019) as Kino Yuuki
Sengoku Night Blood as Takakage Kobayakawa
The city of seven days forever as Izakku
Arknights (2020) as Adnachiel and Noir Corne
The King of Fighters for Girls (2020) as Sie Kensou
A Certain Magical Index: Imaginary Fest (2021) as Gunha Sogīta
King's Raid as Roi
Nioh 2 as Abe no Seimei
Forever 7th Capital as Isaac
SD Gundam Battle Alliance (2022) as Mikazuki Augus

Dubbing

Live-action
Lucas Hedges
Boy Erased as Jared Eamons
Manchester by the Sea as Patrick Chandler
The Zero Theorem as Bob
American Gods as Technical Boy (Bruce Langley)
Body Cam as Danny Holledge (Nat Wolff)
The Book Thief as Rudy Steiner (Nico Liersch)
The D Train as Zach Landsman (Russell Posner)
Dessau Dancers as Michel (Sebastian Jaeger)
Harry Potter and the Deathly Hallows – Part 2 as Blaise Zabini (Louis Cordice)
Into the Storm as Trey Fuller (Nathan Kress)
It Follows as Paul (Keir Gilchrist)
Stealing Cars as Billy Wyatt (Emory Cohen)
They Found Hell as Evan (Laurie Kynaston)
White Boy Rick as "White Boy" Rick Wershe Jr. (Richie Merritt)
Who Am I as Benjamin Engel (Tom Schilling)

Animation 

 Thor: Tales of Asgard as Loki
 Walking with Dinosaurs as Ricky
 Unikitty! as Master Frown
Josee, the Tiger and the Fish as Yukichi

References

External links
 

1985 births
Living people
Japanese male video game actors
Japanese male voice actors
Male voice actors from Osaka Prefecture
21st-century Japanese male actors
Mausu Promotion voice actors